Aechmea mexicana is a plant species in the genus Aechmea. This species is native to central and southern Mexico, Central America, Colombia and Ecuador.

References

mexicana
Flora of Central America
Flora of Mexico
Flora of Ecuador
Flora of Colombia
Plants described in 1879
Taxa named by John Gilbert Baker